James Duncan (1 February 1813 – 30 December 1907) was a New Zealand missionary and presbyterian minister. He was born in Airdrie, Lanarkshire, Scotland on 1 February, 1813.

References

1813 births
1907 deaths
Scottish Presbyterian missionaries
People from Airdrie, North Lanarkshire
New Zealand Presbyterians
Scottish emigrants to New Zealand
Presbyterian missionaries in New Zealand